Maulaheri Jats is a family of Jats (Panwar gotra) that derives its name from the village of Maulaheri, situated on the banks of the Hindon River, in the district of Muzaffarnagar in western Uttar Pradesh. The Maulaheri Jats were the most prominent family of Jat landlords in western Uttar Pradesh. To quote The Imperial Gazetteer of India 1901- Gazetteer of Muzaffarnagar, "The chief Jat landholder in the district is Chaudhri Ghasiram, the son of Chaudhri Jawahir Singh of Maulaheri in tahsil Muzaffarnagar. He is the head of the great family of Maulaheri Jats, and owns twelve villages, paying a revenue of Rs. 9736. Of these six lie in Baghra, three in Muzaffarnagar, two in Khatauli and one in Bhuma Sambalhera.
Now some of the families have been shifted to other villages like "begrajpur".

History

Chaudhri Ghasiram Singh of the Maulaheri family, who was the chief landholder in Muzaffarnagar district, built a fort across the Kaali river and established Ghasipura in present-day Uttar Pradesh. It is said that Chaudhri Ghasiram Singh was to be awarded the title of raja, however, due to his untimely demise, the announcement could not be formalized.

The Maulaheri family also had close links with the family of Liaquat Ali Khan, the first Prime Minister of Pakistan, and fellow aristocrat, whose land holdings lay next to the Maulaheri Jats in the United Provinces of pre-independent India.

Transfers
Between 1800 and 1890 the amount of transfers was about sixteen thousand acres. The chief losers were the Saiyids and Gujars, who between them lost more than half the total area transferred. Over 8599 acres passed out of the hands of Government to other proprietors, and this area should properly be excluded from the rest. The Jats lost nearly 7800 acres, and the Rajputs both Hindu and Muslims nearly 3,000 acres. Besides these the Baluchis who parted with nearly 7,500 arces, alone deserve mention, as they lost over one-third of their small property. The losses of the smaller proprietors are more considerable then would appear from the figures, as Jats of Maulaheri largely extended their possessions. The chief gainers were Banias who increased their estates by over 38,000 acres. Next to them come Sheikhs, Khattris, Brahmans, the Karnal families and Bohras. It thus appears that nearly three-fourths of the land transferred passed into the hands of money lenders.

Study extract
A famous book by Eric Stocks The Peasant and the Raj: Studies in Agrarian Society and Peasant Rebellion in Colonial India which was published by Press Syndicate of the University of Cambridge in 1978, chapter 7 "Rural revolt in the Great Rebellion of 1857 in India" explains:

On the eastern side of Muzaffarnagar district, not merely were the Jats generally a prospering caste, for whom the opening of the majestic Ganges Canal in April 1854 offered splendid prospects, but in the wealthy Jat family of Maulaheri in Muzaffarnagar pargana a new magnate element is evident. By Cadelli's time the family were substantial landholders in Muzaffarnagar and Khatauli, owning altogether some 6000 acre in the Ganges Canal Tract.

Notable family members 

Chaudhri Mahabir Singh: Former Honorary Magistrate of Muzaffarnagar District
Chaudhri Lal Singh: Former Honorary Magistrate of Muzaffarnagar District
Kunwar Devraj panwar:social worker and son of Chaudhri Hariraj Singh honourable magistrate 
Kunwar (Dr.) Krishna Raj Singh: Renowned homeopath, social worker and son of Chaudhri Lal Singh

References

Jat clans of Uttar Pradesh
Muzaffarnagar district